Dinotopia: The Sunstone Odyssey is a 2003 action-adventure video game released by Vicious Cycle Software for GameCube and Xbox. It is based on the Dinotopia book series.

Dinotopia: The Sunstone Odyssey follows the story of Drake Gemini, his twin brother Jacob, and their father, who have been stranded on Dinotopia for 10 years. At the beginning of the game, Drake and Jacob's father is attacked and eaten by a rogue Tyrannosaurus while exploring the outer jungles of Dinotopia. After the killing, Drake and Jacob begin to go their separate ways, with Jacob joining a gang of dinosaur-hating humans called the Outsiders and Drake choosing to take on the role of a guardian of Dinotopia.

Reception 

The game was met with mixed to negative reception, as GameRankings and Metacritic gave it a score of 53% and 50 out of 100, respectively, for the GameCube version, and 47.97% and 44 out of 100 for the Xbox version.

References 

2003 video games
Action-adventure games
Dinosaurs in video games
Dinotopia
GameCube games
Multiplayer and single-player video games
Video games based on novels
Xbox games
Video games developed in the United States
Global Star Software games
Single-player video games
TDK Mediactive games